Christopher Becker (born 1 May 1980) is a German film director, screenwriter, and film producer.

Biography 
Becker studied directing at the Internationale Filmschule Köln, where he graduated in 2005. He also held various positions in the film industry, first as a unit production manager, later as a production manager. Already during his studies he made short films, which were represented at national and international film festivals. These include Frauenparkplatz and his graduation film Mittsommer. From 2007 to 2011, he was along with Johannes F. Sievert and Moritz Grenzebach co-owner and managing director of "Pi Filmproduktion".

From 2008 to 2010, he wrote and directed together with Daniel Rakete Siegel the web series Jabhook with Daniel Wiemer, Raphael Rubino, Anna Angelina Wolfers and Hans-Martin Stier in the lead roles. With Siegel and Sönke Andersen he created the viral spot "Schalenklau" for the company PayPal, which had over two million views on the Internet and was broadcast in several television shows.

At the University of Duisburg-Essen he was a lecturer and had 2011 a cameo in the movie Eine Insel namens Udo.

Filmography

Awards 
His short film Frauenparkplatz won the Made for Mobile Award 2007. In 2010, his viral spot for the Internationale Filmschule Köln was nominated for the Viral Video Award.

References

External links 
 
 Christopher Becker at the German film database Crew United
 Christopher Becker at First Steps
 Christopher Becker at filmportal.de

Living people
Film people from Cologne
1980 births
People from Euskirchen (district)
German male writers